Amy Marie Yeary (December 9, 1989 –  August 15 or 24, 2008) was an American woman whose body was discovered on November 23, 2008, near Campbellsport, Fond du Lac County, Wisconsin. Her body remained unidentified for 13 years before investigators announced her identification via forensic genealogy and dental records on November 23, 2021.

Her face was reconstructed digitally by the National Center for Missing and Exploited Children in 2009 and again in 2018 to approximate her appearance, as decomposition ruled out visual identification. After the revised rendering was released, her remains were exhumed for additional forensic information. Isotope testing indicated she originated from New Mexico or Arizona and had lived in the Midwestern United States for about a year or less before her death. Genetic genealogy research was also utilized as a way to locate potential relatives.

Before her identification in 2021, Yeary was known as "Fond du Lac County Jane Doe". She is believed to have been a victim of human trafficking.

Discovery
The remains of a young woman were found frozen in a creek by hunters on November 23, 2008, in Fond du Lac County, Wisconsin, near an abandoned farm. To extract the body, investigators were forced to chisel away the ice, and scuba divers searched the bottom for evidence. Some articles of clothing were found, including a strapless Zoey Beth brand black-and-pink top with a pink bow, determined to have come from Family Dollar, where it had been available in the spring of 2008. The underclothing that she wore, also from Family Dollar, was shipped only between July 1 and July 15, 2008. The legs of her Angels brand jeans had been rolled up for several turns, and an elastic ponytail holder was found on her wrist.

No socks or shoes were found at the scene. Initially, no jewelry was found, until a penny-sized St. Benedict medal was found by divers. The medal may not have belonged to her, as examiners could not be certain how long it had been in the water. However, some reports state that a bracelet with several pendants on it was also found on the girl's remains. Her hair was a shoulder-length light brown of differing shades, possibly due to having been highlighted. Because items of her clothing were in various sizes, ascertaining her build was problematic; however, it has been determined that she most likely weighed around 120 pounds.

Examination

Her cause of death was inconclusive, as severe decomposition of the body had removed all signs of possible violence from the remains. However, the manner of death is believed to be homicide, as suicide was eliminated as a possibility. The location where the remains were found had also raised suspicion among authorities. Toxicology tests were conducted to see if any drugs or alcohol had been in her system, but the results were never released.

Although the body was found in autumn, she had died in the summer, two to four months previously. This was established by examining traces from insects that were found on the remains. She had an overbite, and some fillings and dental sealants were found on the upper molars with no current cavities. The overbite was not described as extreme, but may have been noticeable, which could be a reliable feature depicted in her facial reconstruction. The estimated height was between 4'10" and 5'4", the victim being between fifteen and twenty-one years old and weighing between 110 to 135 pounds, at an "average frame". Examiners believe she was either white or Hispanic, although the possibility that she was Native American or Asian cannot be ruled out. She also may have been biracial. Other physical characteristics included a healed rib fracture and being pigeon toed or knock-kneed, which may have been noticeable when she walked, as her feet were slanted inward. She also suffered from spina bifida occulta, but may have been unaware of the condition.

To obtain DNA information, her femur was transported to the University of Texas. Her DNA was entered into the National DNA database and dental records were created that can be compared to those of reported missing persons.

Investigation

At least 200 leads have been explored in the effort to identify the victim. A computer-generated reconstruction was created from the skull by the National Center for Missing and Exploited Children from mortuary photographs and a CT scan of the skull that were submitted to the center. The reconstruction of the victim generated over two hundred tips that did not produce solid leads, as the composite apparently resembled a large number of missing people. Former missing person Amanda Berry, one of several possible identities of the Jane Doe, was ruled out by DNA analysis. She was recovered alive in 2013.

Besides Amanda Berry, two other individuals who were eventually located were also ruled out of the case: Connie McCallister and Brittany Peart. McCallister, native to Wisconsin, was abducted at age 16 and taken to Mexico. She was eventually recovered alive after meeting a "church missionary" who reported the information to the National Center for Missing & Exploited Children. Brittany Peart disappeared in July 2008 from Elkton, Maryland. Peart's remains were located and identified in December 2011. Her cause of death remains unreleased.

The Jane Doe's body was buried in 2011 after the investigation turned cold. Television shows such as America's Most Wanted broadcast the case to possibly reveal new clues. A Facebook page was also created to generate leads for the case.

On April 23, 2018, a revised reconstruction was released and authorities announced that the victim would be exhumed for isotope testing and DNA phenotyping to determine geographical locations where she may have lived and to develop a clearer estimation of her ethnicity and physical characteristics. Genetic genealogy, credited with identifying a suspect in the Golden State Killer case, would also be used to locate individuals biologically related to the victim.

In August 2018, the results of an isotopic analysis performed by Utah’s IsoForensics laboratory were released. They indicated that the Jane Doe had likely spent most of her life in the Southwestern United States, possibly in Arizona or New Mexico. She had lived in the Midwest—perhaps in southwestern Wisconsin, northern Iowa, or southern Minnesota—for less than a year preceding her death. Investigators speculated that her case was related to the so-called West Mesa murders, but this was later ruled out.

Identification 
Thirteen years to the date of the discovery of her remains, it was announced that Yeary was positively identified via leads produced by forensic genetic genealogy conducted by Barbara Rae-Venter. The identification was confirmed with comparison of DNA from her mother, sister, and dental x-rays.

Officials say Yeary would have been 18 years old when she died in 2008. They also learned she spent time in Milwaukee, Chicago, and Beloit in the weeks preceding her death. While speaking with Yeary's mother, detectives learned that Yeary made a phone call to her mother from Beloit in 2008 saying she wanted a ride home. The mother was unable to accommodate that request at the time. Yeary was never heard from by her family again.

See also
 List of homicides in Wisconsin
List of unsolved murders
Smurfette Jane Doe, an unidentified teenaged girl who may have been involved in human trafficking
Murder of Peggy Johnson, a formerly unidentified woman found in Wisconsin in 1999.

References

External links

2008 deaths
2008 murders in the United States
2008 in Wisconsin
Deaths by person in Wisconsin
Female murder victims
People from Fond du Lac County, Wisconsin
People murdered in Wisconsin
Unsolved murders in the United States
Violence against women in the United States